Robert Barr or Bob Barr may refer to:

Sports
 Robert Barr (field hockey) (born 1978), Scottish field hockey player
 Robert Barr (footballer) ( 1900s), Scottish footballer with Third Lanark
 Bob Barr (1880s pitcher) (1856–1930), Major League Baseball pitcher
 Bob Barr (footballer, born 1865) (1865–1935), Scottish footballer
 Bob Barr (1930s pitcher) (1908–2002), baseball pitcher for the Brooklyn Dodgers
 Bob Barr (Australian footballer) (born 1945), Australian footballer

Others
 Sir Robert Barr, 1st Baronet (died 1629)
 Robert Barr (Australian politician) (1862–1947)
 Robert Barr (writer) (1850–1912), British-Canadian novelist
 Robert B. Barr (born 1953), co-founder and co-CEO of Lincoln International
 Robert M. Barr (1918–1988), American conductor of Jordan High School Band
 Robert Barr, founder of soft drink manufacturer A.G. Barr
 Bob Barr (born 1948), American attorney and 2008 Libertarian Party candidate for President of the United States
 Robert Barr, a character on the American soap opera Santa Barbara

See also
 Barr (surname), other people with the surname Barr
 Barr Tribunal, an Irish public inquiry presided over by Robert Barr